The Critics' Choice Television Award for Best Supporting Actress in a Movie/Miniseries is one of the award categories presented annually by the Critics' Choice Television Awards (BTJA) to recognize the work done by television actors. The winners are selected by a group of television critics that are part of the Broadcast Television Critics Association.

History
The category was first introduced for the 3rd Critics' Choice Television Awards, in which Sarah Paulson was the first actress to receive the award.

Winners and nominees

2010s
{| class="wikitable" style="width:85%"
|- style="background:#bebebe;"
! style="width:10%;"| Year
! style="wodth:25%;"| Actor
! style="width:30%;"| Series
! style="width:20%;"| Character
! style="width:15%;"| Network
|-
|rowspan="6" style="text-align:center;"| 2013 || style="background:#B0C4DE;" | Sarah Paulson ||style="background:#B0C4DE;" | American Horror Story: Asylum ||style="background:#B0C4DE;" | Lana Winters || style="background:#B0C4DE;" |FX
|-
| Ellen Burstyn || Political Animals || Margaret Barrish || USA
|-
| Sienna Miller || rowspan="2"|The Girl || Tippi Hedren || rowspan="2"|HBO
|-
| Imelda Staunton || Alma Reville
|-
| Lily Rabe || American Horror Story: Asylum || Sister Mary Eunice McKee || FX
|-
| Alfre Woodard || Steel Magnolias|| Louisa "Ouiser" Boudreaux || Lifetime
|-
|rowspan="6" style="text-align:center;"| 2014|| style="background:#B0C4DE;" | Allison Tolman || style="background:#B0C4DE;" | Fargo|| style="background:#B0C4DE;" | Deputy Molly Solverson || style="background:#B0C4DE;" |FX
|-
| Amanda Abbington || Sherlock: His Last Vow || Mary Morstan || PBS
|-
| Kathy Bates || American Horror Story: Coven || Delphine LaLaurie || FX
|-
| Ellen Burstyn || Flowers in the Attic || Olivia Foxworth || rowspan="2"|Lifetime
|-
| Jessica Raine || An Adventure in Space and Time || Verity Lambert
|-
| Julia Roberts || The Normal Heart || Dr. Emma Brookner || HBO
|-
|rowspan="6" style="text-align:center;"| 2015|| style="background:#B0C4DE;" | Sarah Paulson || style="background:#B0C4DE;" | American Horror Story: Freak Show|| style="background:#B0C4DE;" | Bette and Dot Tattler || style="background:#B0C4DE;" |FX
|-
| Khandi Alexander || rowspan="2"|Bessie ||  Viola Smith || rowspan="2"|HBO
|-
| Mo'Nique || Ma Rainey
|-
| Claire Foy || Wolf Hall ||  Anne Boleyn || PBS
|-
| Janet McTeer || The Honourable Woman || Dame Julia Walsh || SundanceTV
|-
| Cynthia Nixon || Stockholm, Pennsylvania || Marcy Owens || Lifetime
|-
|rowspan="6" style="text-align:center;"| 2016 (1)|| style="background:#B0C4DE;" | Jean Smart || style="background:#B0C4DE;" | Fargo || style="background:#B0C4DE;" | Floyd Gerhardt || style="background:#B0C4DE;" | FX
|-
| Mary J. Blige || The Wiz Live! ||  Evillene, the Wicked Witch of the West || NBC
|-
| Laura Haddock || Luther || Megan Cantor || BBC America
|-
| Cristin Milioti || Fargo || Betsy Solverson || rowspan="2"|FX
|-
| Sarah Paulson || American Horror Story: Hotel || Sally McKenna
|-
| Winona Ryder || Show Me a Hero || Vinni Restiano || HBO
|-
|rowspan="6" style="text-align:center;"| 2016 (2)|| style="background:#B0C4DE;" | Regina King || style="background:#B0C4DE;" |American Crime || style="background:#B0C4DE;" |Terri LaCroix || style="background:#B0C4DE;" |ABC|-
| Elizabeth Debicki || The Night Manager || Jed Marshall || AMC
|-
| Sarah Lancashire || rowspan="2"|The Dresser || Madge || rowspan="2"|Starz
|-
| Emily Watson || "Her Ladyship"
|- 
| Melissa Leo || All the Way || Lady Bird Johnson || HBO
|-
| Anna Paquin || Roots || Nancy Holt || History
|-
| rowspan="6" style="text-align:center;"|2018 || style="background:#B0C4DE;" | Laura Dern || style="background:#B0C4DE;" |Big Little Lies || style="background:#B0C4DE;" |Renata Klein || style="background:#B0C4DE;" |HBO|-
|Judy Davis || rowspan="2"|Feud: Bette and Joan || Hedda Hopper || rowspan="3"|FX
|-
|Jackie Hoffman || Mamacita
|-
|Mary Elizabeth Winstead || Fargo || Nikki Swango
|- 
|Regina King || American Crime || Kimara Walters ||ABC
|-
|Michelle Pfeiffer || |The Wizard of Lies || Ruth Madoff || HBO
|-
| rowspan="6" style="text-align:center;"|2019 || style="background:#B0C4DE;" | Patricia Clarkson || style="background:#B0C4DE;" |Sharp Objects || style="background:#B0C4DE;" |Adora Crellin || style="background:#B0C4DE;" |HBO|-
|Ellen Burstyn || The Tale || Nadine "Nettie" Fox || HBO
|-
|Penélope Cruz || rowspan="2"|The Assassination of Gianni Versace: American Crime Story || Donatella Versace || rowspan="2"|FX
|-
|Judith Light || Marilyn Miglin
|-
|Julia Garner || Dirty John || Terra Newell || Bravo
|-
|Elizabeth Perkins || Sharp Objects || Jackie O'Neill || HBO
|- 
|}

2020s

Multiple wins2 winsSarah Paulson

Multiple nominations3 nominationsEllen Burstyn
Sarah Paulson2 nominations'''
Regina King
Niecy Nash-Betts
Winona Ryder
Jean Smart
Emily Watson

See also
Golden Globe Award for Best Supporting Actress – Series, Miniseries or Television Film
Primetime Emmy Award for Outstanding Supporting Actress in a Limited Series or Movie

References

External links
 

Critics' Choice Television Awards
Television awards for Best Supporting Actress
Awards established in 2013